Le Pressoir d'Argent ("The Silver Press") is a two Michelin star restaurant owned by British celebrity chef and restaurateur Gordon Ramsay located in Bordeaux, France. It opened in 2015 and was Ramsay's third restaurant in France.

Description
Le Pressoir d'Argent is located on the first floor of the InterContinental Bordeaux Le Grand Hôtel in Bordeaux, France. Dishes served include "native lobster from the ‘press’ steamed with lemon leaf, corn, girolles, courgettes, coral and lemon grass bisque; and blonde d’ Aquitaine veal, braised shin, bone marrow, white root vegetables, soft herbs and consommé." The restaurant's menu was developed by Ramsay with head chef Gilad Peled.

History
Le Pressoir d’Argent was opened in September 2015 and was Ramsay's third restaurant in France after the Trianon Palace and the Veranda in Versailles. It was awarded two Michelin stars in the 2016 list.

See also
 List of restaurants owned or operated by Gordon Ramsay

References

Restaurants in France